Rail Malikov (born 18 December 1985) is an Azerbaijani football defender who plays for Keşla.

Career 
Malikov was born in Baku, Azerbaijan.

In the summer of 2012, Malikov left Neftchi Baku for TFF First League side Denizlispor. Malikov made 25 appearances for Denizlispor in his first, and only season with the club.

Gabala
On 2 July 2013, Malikov returned to the Azerbaijan Premier League to sign a one-year contract with Gabala. Malikov made his debut for Gabala on 2 August 2013 against Baku, a game Gabala won 2–1. On 31 August 2013, in Gabala's 2–0 victory over Khazar Lankaran, Malikov broke his leg and was ruled out for 4–5 months. Malikov made his return from injury on 19 March 2014 in the Azerbaijan Cup. Malikov left Gabala at the end of his contract.

Return to Denizlispor
On 7 August 2014, Malikov re-signed for Denizlispor on a one-year contract.

Sumgayit
On 21 June 2016, Malikov signed with Sumgayit.

Keşla
On 24 August 2020, Malikov signed a contract with Keşla FK until the end of the 2020–21 season.

Career statistics

Honours
FK Baku
Azerbaijan Premier League (1): 2005–06
Azerbaijan Cup (1): 2004–05

Neftchi Baku
Azerbaijan Premier League (2): 2010–11, 2011–12

References

External links
 Player profile on official club website 
 
 

Living people
1985 births
Association football defenders
Azerbaijani footballers
Azerbaijan international footballers
Azerbaijani expatriate footballers
Expatriate footballers in Turkey
Azerbaijani expatriate sportspeople in Turkey
Gabala FC players
Denizlispor footballers
AZAL PFK players
Sumgayit FK players
Neftçi PFK players
Shamakhi FK players
Azerbaijan Premier League players
TFF First League players